Consort Jia may refer to:

Imperial consorts with the surname Jia
Consort Jia (Han dynasty) ( 1st century), concubine of Emperor Ming of Han
Jia Nanfeng (257–300), wife of Emperor Hui of Jin
Jia Yuanchun, fictional character from Dream of the Red Chamber

Imperial consorts with the title Consort Jia
Imperial Noble Consort Shujia (1713–1755), concubine of the Qianlong Emperor, known as Concubine Jia or Consort Jia in his harem
Noble Consort Jia (1816–1890), concubine of the Daoguang Emperor